The 2006 Australian Open was played between 16 and 29 January 2006.

Marat Safin could not defend his 2005 title, due to an injury he suffered in late 2005. Roger Federer won his second Australian Open title, defeating Marcos Baghdatis in the final in four sets. Serena Williams was unsuccessful in defending her 2005 title, losing in the third round against Daniela Hantuchová. Amélie Mauresmo won her first Australian Open title, defeating 2004 champion Justine Henin in the final; Henin-Hardenne was forced to retire at 1–6, 0–2 down due to a stomach virus. It began Henin-Hardenne's run of reaching the final of all four Grand Slam events, winning the French Open.

Leadup 
Several leading men's players declined to attend the Open due to injury, including Andre Agassi, Rafael Nadal and defending champion Marat Safin. The women's tournament had no absentees among the top 20 ranked players.

It was Martina Hingis' first grand slam event in her comeback to the game. Lindsay Davenport and Serena Williams were among those who welcomed her return to the circuit as a positive step forward for women's tennis.

Day-by-day schedules

Day 1 (16 January)

Day 2 (17 January)

Day 3 (18 January)

Finals

Seniors

Men's singles 

 Roger Federer defeated  Marcos Baghdatis, 5–7, 7–5, 6–0, 6–2
It was Federer's 2nd title of the year, and his 35th overall. It was his 7th career Grand Slam title, and his 2nd Australian Open title.

Women's singles 
 
 Amélie Mauresmo defeated  Justine Henin, 6–1, 2–0, retired
It was Mauresmo's 1st title of the year, and her 20th overall. It was her 1st career Grand Slam title.

Men's doubles 

 Bob Bryan /  Mike Bryan defeated  Martin Damm /  Leander Paes, 4–6, 6–3, 6–4

Women's doubles 

 Yan Zi /  Zheng Jie defeated  Samantha Stosur /  Lisa Raymond, 2–6, 7–6(7), 6–3

Mixed doubles

 Martina Hingis /  Mahesh Bhupathi defeated  Elena Likhovtseva /  Daniel Nestor, 6–3, 6–3

Juniors

Boys' singles 

 Alexandre Sidorenko defeated  Nick Lindahl, 6–3, 7–6(4)

Girls' singles 

 Anastasia Pavlyuchenkova defeated  Caroline Wozniacki, 1–6, 6–2, 6–3

Boys' doubles 

 Błażej Koniusz /  Grzegorz Panfil defeated  Kellen Damico /  Nathaniel Schnugg, 7–6(5), 6–3

Girls' doubles 

 Sharon Fichman /  Anastasia Pavlyuchenkova defeated  Alizé Cornet /  Corinna Dentoni, 6–2, 6–2

Legends

Men's doubles
  John Fitzgerald /  Todd Woodbridge defeated  Pat Cash /  Peter McNamara, 6–3, 6–3,

Mixed doubles
  Phil Dent /  Dianne Balestrat defeated  Tony Roche /  Liz Smylie, 6–1, 6–1

Wheelchair

Men's singles
 Michaël Jérémiasz defeated  Satoshi Saida, 5–7, 6–4, 6–3

Women's singles
 Esther Vergeer defeated  Jiske Griffioen, 6–4, 6–0

Men's doubles
 Robin Ammerlaan /  Martin Legner defeated  Michaël Jérémiasz /  Satoshi Saida, 3–6, 6–3 7–6(5)

Women's doubles
 Jiske Griffioen /  Esther Vergeer defeated  Yuka Chokyu /  Mie Yaosa, 6–2, 6–0

Seeds

Men's singles 

reference

Women's singles 

reference

Attendance

Withdrawals

Men's Singles
  Andre Agassi → replaced by  Fernando Vicente
  Karol Beck → replaced by  Ricardo Mello
  Guillermo Cañas → replaced by  Potito Starace
  Joachim Johansson → replaced by  Juan Antonio Marín
  Nicolás Lapentti → replaced by  Justin Gimelstob
  Alberto Martín → replaced by  Federico Luzzi
  Rafael Nadal → replaced by  Nicolás Almagro
  Jiří Novák → replaced by  Raemon Sluiter
  Mariano Puerta → replaced by  Jean-René Lisnard
  Greg Rusedski → replaced by  Óscar Hernández
  Marat Safin → replaced by  Alexander Waske
  Robin Söderling → replaced by  Lee Hyung-taik
  Martin Verkerk → replaced by  Răzvan Sabău

Women's Singles
  Elena Bovina → replaced by  Shenay Perry
  Stéphanie Cohen-Aloro → replaced by  Galina Voskoboeva
  Sesil Karatantcheva → replaced by  Yuliana Fedak
  Magdalena Maleeva → replaced by  Martina Müller
  Conchita Martínez → replaced by  Saori Obata
  Květa Peschke → replaced by  Camille Pin
  Fabiola Zuluaga → replaced by  Conchita Martínez Granados

References

Notes

External links 

 Australian Open official site

 
 

 
2006 in Australian tennis
January 2006 sports events in Australia
2006,Australian Open